Oussama "Ous" Mellouli (born 16 February 1984) is a Tunisian swimmer who competes in the freestyle and medley events. He is a three-time Olympic medalist, is an African record holder, and trains with the USC Trojans team based at the University of Southern California, where he studied as a computer science undergraduate and swam collegiately.

Since returning from an Adderall-related drugs ban, Oussama Mellouli has been the 1500 m freestyle World champion at the 2009 World Aquatics Championships with a winning time of 14:37.28, then the second-best performance of all time. Mellouli was the gold medalist in the 1500 freestyle at the 2008 Olympics, the bronze medalist in the 1500 freestyle at the 2012 Olympics, and the gold medalist in the 10 km marathon swim at the 2012 Olympics. He is the first Olympian to win medals in both the open water and the pool in a single Olympics.

Biography
Born in Tunis, Mellouli left Tunisia at the age of 15 to study and train in France. He enrolled in USC Viterbi School of Engineering in 2003 after graduating from the Lycee Technologique du Rempart in Marseille, France. He swam for the USC Trojans and graduated in 2007 with a computer science bachelor's degree. He is a scholarship holder with the Olympic Solidarity program.

Swimming Timeline

2000 Olympics
At the 2000 Olympics, he finished 43rd in the 400 IM.

2001
Mellouli won 1 silver medal in the 400m IM at the 2001 Mediterranean Games, in Tunis, Tunisia.

2003
Mellouli first established himself on the world scene at the 2003 World Championships in Barcelona, Spain, where he won a bronze in the 400m Individual Medley finishing behind László Cseh and a world record performance from Michael Phelps.

2004
At the 2004 Olympics, he finished 5th in the 400 IM, setting the African Record in the process. He further distinguished himself at the 2004 FINA Short Course World Championships in Indianapolis, USA, where he won the first international-level gold medal in swimming for Tunisia, in the 400m IM, finishing over a second ahead of second and third-place finishers Robin Francis and Eric Shanteau. Later, at the meet, he would win bronze in the 200m IM.

2005
He was able to better his Athens mark with his bronze medal swim in the 400 IM event at the 2005 World Aquatics Championships in Montreal, Canada. He also won the bronze medal in the 400 freestyle at that same event. He also won three gold medals (800 m freestyle, 400m medley, 200m medley) at the XVth Mediterranean Games in Almería, Spain.

2006
On 1 December 2006, Oussama Mellouli beat Michael Phelps in the 400m IM at the U.S. Open in West Lafayette: Mellouli clocked 4:15.61, ahead of Phelps with 4:18.32. This swim was subsequently placed within Mellouli's 18-month doping ban, and the results nullified, as the drug test where the banned substance was found occurred at this meet (see the section below for further information).

2007
On 19 February 2007, he broke his own African Record in the 200m individual medley for the fourth time since 2003 at the USA Swimming Grand Prix meet, held at the Mizzou Aquatic Center at the University of Missouri. He also set a new African record in the 400 meter individual medley.

On 25 March 2007, he won the silver in the 400 m freestyle (3:45.12) at the 2007 World Championships in Melbourne, Australia. Three days later, on 28 March, he swam to the first Tunisian World Championship in swimming, winning the 800m freestyle in a then African Record of 7:46.95 — one of the top 10 fastest times ever. However, due to his positive drug-testing result from an in-competition test from December 2006 and the 18-month competition ban imposed on him on 11 September 2007 by the Court of Arbitration for Sport (CAS), retroactive from 30 November 2006 forward, his 2007 World Championships results have been nullified. He was also a finalist in the 400 m individual medley, where he originally finished fourth in 4:11.68.

Following the 11 September 2007 ruling by CAS, Mellouli was not allowed to compete again until mid-2008. Mellouli's results from 2007 have been nullified, per his September 2007 doping suspension, related to his positive test from December 2006 (see the section below).

2008 Olympics
Mellouli came into the 2008 Olympics in Beijing, China entered two events, the 400m and 1500m freestyle events. In his first event, the 400m free, despite setting a new African record in the final, he could only manage fifth place in a time of 3:43.45. Mellouli would go on to win the 1500m freestyle and set a new African record. In doing so, he became the first African male swimmer to ever win an Olympic gold medal in an individual swimming event (the South African men's 4 × 100 m Free Relay won the event at the 2004 Olympics).

2009
Mellouli won 5 gold medals (200m and 400m individual medley, and 200m, 400m, and 1500m freestyles) at the XVI Mediterranean Games in Pescara, Italy.

In the 2009 World Aquatics Championships, held in Rome during the summer, Mellouli won a gold medal in the 1500 meter freestyle and two silver medals in the 400 meter freestyle and 800 meter freestyle.

2010
Mellouli won 4 medals ( 1 gold in the 1500 freestyle, 1 silver in the 400 medley, and 2 bronzes in the 200 m freestyle and the 400 m freestyle) at the  2010 FINA Short Course World Championships (25m) in Dubai, UAE.

2011
Mellouli won 16 medals ( 15 gold and 1 silver ) at the 2011 Pan Arab Games in Doha, Qatar.

2012 Olympics
Mellouli won 2 medals (1 gold in the 10km marathon and 1 bronze in the 1500m freestyle) at the 2012 Summer Olympics held in London, UK. He became the first person to win medals in the pool and open-water swimming in the same Olympics.

2013
Mellouli won 1 gold medal in the 5km marathon at the 2013 World Championships, in Barcelona, Spain.

2016 Olympics
Mellouli participated in two competitions in Rio 2016 Summer Olympics but did not win any medals. In the 1500m freestyle, he came first in his heat with 15:07.78 (considerably slower than his London 2012 Summer Olympics time of 14:40.31) but ranked 21st in the competition and thus did not qualify for the final. He also competed in the 10km marathon, finishing in 12th place with 1:53:06 (+0:00:07 of the gold winner).

2020 Olympics
In July 2021, Mellouli had initially decided to withdraw from the 2020 Summer Olympics in Tokyo due to a dispute with the Tunisian federation for alleged forgery since 2017. However, he later announced that he would compete at the Tokyo Games, as the Tunisian Olympic Committee President Mahrez Boussian had promised to settle the dispute.

2021 Olympics
On Wednesday, August 4, 2021, Tunisian swimmer Oussama Mellouli finished 20th in the 10 km open water marathon at the Tokyo Olympics.
Mellouli was thus unable to earn another medal on his sixth appearance at the Olympic Games.

Positive drug test
A few weeks after the conclusion of the 2007 World Championships, reports began to surface that Mellouli had tested positive for a banned substance at the 2006 U.S. Open, 30 November – 2 December 2006. These reports surfaced because FINA, the international governing body of the sport, had discovered that Tunisian authorities had known about the positive test but had only given him a warning. FINA/WADA rules state that athletes must be given a 2-year ban from the sport when they test positive for a banned substance. Accordingly, FINA took the case to the Court of Arbitration for Sport (CAS), demanding stiffer sanctions.

Mellouli has since admitted that he took the ADD medication Adderall, a stimulant and a form of amphetamine. (Already in June 2006, an American sports commentator wrote: Various studies show rampant use of Adderall, Ritalin and other drugs normally used for attention deficit disorder instead applied toward all-night cramming sessions. ) Mellouli did not have a prescription for the drug, having claimed to have received it from another USC student shortly before the US Open. He argued that he took the pill to help himself with writing a term paper (to sustain or enhance his academic performance) in the days leading up to the weekend US Open meet and that the drug was not intended as a performance-enhancing substance for competitive swimming. However, amphetamines are on the official banned substances list; and can/do help swimming performance.

CAS ruled on Mellouli's case on 11 September 2007, ruling against him and issuing him an 18-month competition suspension retroactively beginning on 30 November 2006. As a result of this sanction, all his results from the 2006 U.S. Open through the competitions he swam in 2007, including the 2007 World Championships, were nullified. His ban from competition covered most, but not all, of the qualification window for the 2008 Olympics. As the retroactive nullification of results wiped out all of his qualifying times for the 2008 Games, he ended up with just a week or two after the ban in order to qualify (which he did).

Achievements
 2013 World Championships – 1 gold medal (5 km marathon) and 1 bronze medal (10 k marathon)
 2012 Summer Olympics – gold medal (10 km marathon) and bronze medal (1500 m freestyle).
 2009 World Championships – 1 gold medal (1500 m freestyle) and 2 silver medals (400 m freestyle, 800 m freestyle)
 2008 Summer Olympics – gold medal (1500 m freestyle)
 2007 World Championships — results nullified.
 2005 World Championships – bronze medal (400m individual medley and 400m freestyle)
 2004 Olympic Games – fifth place (400 m individual medley)
 2004 FINA Short Course World Championships – bronze medal (200 m individual medley)
 2004 FINA Short Course World Championships – gold medal (400 m individual medley)
 2003 World Championships – bronze medal (400 m individual medley)

See also
 Adderall#Enhancing performance
 List of sportspeople sanctioned for doping offences
 Tunisia at the 2012 Summer Olympics

References

External links
 Personal webpage of Oussama Mellouli at the University of Southern California

1984 births
Living people
Tunisian male freestyle swimmers
Male medley swimmers
Male long-distance swimmers
Doping cases in swimming
Olympic swimmers of Tunisia
Olympic gold medalists for Tunisia
Olympic bronze medalists for Tunisia
Sportspeople from Tunis
Swimmers at the 2000 Summer Olympics
Swimmers at the 2004 Summer Olympics
Swimmers at the 2008 Summer Olympics
Swimmers at the 2012 Summer Olympics
Swimmers at the 2016 Summer Olympics
Swimmers at the 2020 Summer Olympics
Tunisian expatriate sportspeople in the United States
Tunisian male swimmers
USC Trojans men's swimmers
Olympic gold medalists in swimming
Olympic bronze medalists in swimming
World Aquatics Championships medalists in swimming
World Aquatics Championships medalists in open water swimming
Medalists at the FINA World Swimming Championships (25 m)
Medalists at the 2012 Summer Olympics
Medalists at the 2008 Summer Olympics
Mediterranean Games gold medalists for Tunisia
Mediterranean Games silver medalists for Tunisia
Swimmers at the 2001 Mediterranean Games
Swimmers at the 2005 Mediterranean Games
Swimmers at the 2009 Mediterranean Games
Swimmers at the 2013 Mediterranean Games
African Games gold medalists for Tunisia
African Games medalists in swimming
Mediterranean Games medalists in swimming
Competitors at the 2003 All-Africa Games
21st-century Tunisian people